Mathias Olsson (born 23 April 1973) is a Swedish former professional ice hockey defenceman. He played 37 games in the Elitserien with Leksands IF during the 1996-97 season.

References

1973 births
Living people
IK Oskarshamn players
Leksands IF players
Swedish ice hockey defencemen
Växjö Lakers players
People from Tingsryd Municipality
Sportspeople from Kronoberg County